Smith Creek is a stream in Warren County in the U.S. state of Missouri. It is a tributary of the Missouri River.

Smith Creek most likely has the name of Wilhelm Schmidt (William Smith), a German settler.

See also
List of rivers of Missouri

References

Rivers of Warren County, Missouri
Rivers of Missouri